Robert Cohen (born 1957) is an American novelist and short fiction writer.

Life
Cohen grew up in Westfield, New Jersey. He attended UC Berkeley and subsequently received his MFA from Columbia University.

Works
Cohen's themes center around issues of contemporary identity and transcendence.  His writing has been praised as "wild and ingenious" by The New York Times, "formidable" by The Atlantic Monthly, and "ruefully funny" by the San Francisco Chronicle. DG Meyers of A Commonplace Blog writes, "Sentence by sentence, Robert Cohen is perhaps the best prose stylist of any American novelist now writing."

His first novel, The Organ Builder, was praised by the New York Times Book Review as "an intimate, stunningly written portrait of a man and his reluctant confrontation with the past … all narrated in a voice that often approaches sheer poetry."  His second, The Here and Now, won the Ribalow Prize for Best Jewish Novel of 1996.  His third novel, Inspired Sleep, was called "a sparkling comic novel of postmodern pathologies…more than just a brilliant book – it's a transporting read" and "a great fat multiplex of a novel, beautifully written, funny, moving, sardonic and sad, it's a brilliantly executed indictment of our biomechanistic age, where there's a cure for every ache and, more importantly, an ache for every cure."

A collection of stories, The Varieties of Romantic Experience, was published in 2002; his most recent novel, Amateur Barbarians, in 2009.  For these he has earned numerous awards, including a Guggenheim Fellowship, a Whiting Writers Award, a Lila Wallace Writers Award, and a Pushcart Prize.

A former Briggs-Copeland Lecturer at Harvard University, Cohen has also taught at the Iowa Writers Workshop, Rice University,  the University of Houston, and SUNY Stony Brook. He currently teaches literature and creative writing at Middlebury College.[1]

Books
The Organ Builder. Harper & Row. 1988. 
The Here and Now. Scribner. 1996. 
Inspired Sleep: A Novel. Scribner. 2001. 
The Varieties of Romantic Experience: Stories. Scribner. 2002. 
"The Varieties of Romantic Experience", Originally published in Harper's, February 1990
Amateur Barbarians. Scribner. 2009.

Stories and essays

Awards
1987: Pushcart Prize
2000: Whiting Award
2003: Guggenheim Fellowship
Lila Wallace/Reader's Digest Award

References

External links
Profile at The Whiting Foundation
NPR Review of The Varieties of Romance

Living people
1957 births
American male novelists
20th-century American novelists
21st-century American novelists
Columbia University School of the Arts alumni
University of California, Berkeley alumni
20th-century American male writers
21st-century American male writers